WPRT (960 kHz) is an AM radio station broadcasting a classic hits format. Licensed to Prestonsburg, Kentucky, United States, the station is currently owned by Lynn Parrish, through licensee Mountain Top Media LLC.

Translators

Previous logo

References

External links
Official Website

PRT
Classic hits radio stations in the United States
Radio stations established in 1952
1952 establishments in Kentucky
Prestonsburg, Kentucky